Barra do Garças is a city with a population of 61,135 located in the Brazilian state of Mato Grosso, around  far from the capital city of Cuiabá. It was founded on 13 June 1924, but it became political independent just on 15 September 1948. Nowadays, Barra do Garças is the 8th biggest city in Mato Grosso. It is situated on the border between Mato Grosso and Goiás states and due to this a geodesic center settled down there.

A small but developed tourist city due to high agriculture exportation and a strong military presence, Barra do Garças also has a Cristo Redentor (Christ the Redeemer) and is known as Rio de Janeiro do Oeste (Rio de Janeiro of the West.

The municipality contains the  Serra Azul State Park, created in 1994.
Barra do Garças has many other tourist attractions: a Discoporto, (UFOport), water parks, as well as hot springs, mountains, and fresh water beaches.

The city is served by Barra do Garças Airport.

References

External links

Barra do Garças  on TV Globo

Municipalities in Mato Grosso